The Security Information Service (BIS), is the primary domestic national intelligence agency of the Czech Republic. It is responsible for collecting, analyzing, reporting and disseminating intelligence on threats to Czech Republic's national security, and conducting operations, covert and overt, both domestically and abroad. It also reports to and advises the Government of the Czech Republic on national security issues and situations that threaten the security of the nation.

The BIS headquarters is located in Stodůlky, Prague 5. The Security Information Service reports directly to the Government, Prime Minister and President of the Czech Republic and is overseen by the Permanent Commission of the Chamber of Deputies.

Command, control and organization
The BIS is a statutory body under the Act No. 154/1994 Coll., on the Security Information Service and it is strictly apolitical and has no police powers; BIS cannot detain, arrest or interrogate suspects. The service reports to the Government, Prime Minister and President of the Czech Republic and its activities are regulated and controlled by the Government, Permanent Commission of the Chamber of Deputies and its own internal audit. The service is headed by the Director who is appointed by the Prime Minister with consent of the Committee on Security of the Chamber of Deputies.

Duties 
The Security Information Service performs duties associated with the analysis, democracy and constitutionality, terrorism, counter-intelligence, cybersecurity, organized crime, proliferation and use of strategically important intelligence regarding the fields of politics, economics and intelligence within the territory of the Czech Republic.

See also
Centre Against Terrorism and Hybrid Threats

References

External links
 
  
 
 "BIS (Czech Counter-intelligence service) in transformation, 1994-2014", Yu Cheng, European Intelligence Academy, Charles University in Prague, July 2014

Notes

Security Information Service, Czech
Czech intelligence community
1994 establishments in the Czech Republic